AppFabric is a set of middleware technologies for Windows Server, released by Microsoft. It consists of two main feature areas: AppFabric Hosting and AppFabric Caching. Microsoft support for these ended in November 2017. A newer version of the product from Microsoft is Service Fabric.

AppFabric hosting
AppFabric Hosting features provide a way for users to deploy and manage Windows Workflow Foundation (WF) workflows that are hosted in Windows Communication Foundation (WCF) services. AppFabric includes an extension of the Internet Information Services management tool that enables an IIS administrator to monitor the performance of services and workflows. There is also a set of Windows PowerShell commands to manage persistence, hosting, and monitoring tasks. AppFabric Hosting features provides persistence, hosting, and monitoring.

Persistence allows Windows Workflow Foundation services to save the state of long running workflows to a database. This makes Workflow more durable in the event of deliberate suspensions or unexpected hardware failures. Hosting facilitates the management of WCF and WF services within IIS and the Windows Process Activation service (WAS). Monitoring stores and correlates service events in a backend database.

AppFabric caching
AppFabric Caching is an in-memory, distributed cache that runs on one or more on-premises servers to provide a performance and scalability boost for .NET Framework applications. AppFabric caches store data in key-value pairs using the physical memory across multiple servers. The service presents that memory as a single resource. Caches are configured and managed through a set of Windows PowerShell commands.

ASP.NET caching providers

One use of caching is to store ASP.NET session state data. When a user connects to an ASP.NET Web application, the application can store information in session state. This can be used in subsequent requests from the same user. Rather than store that information in-memory on each web server, a built-in session state provider can route session data to a backend cache. This enables the ASP.NET application to store large amounts of cached data. It also allows future user requests to route to any web server, because each web server references the same backend cache.

In addition to the ASP.NET session state provider, there is also a provider for ASP.NET page output caching.

Caching API
.NET applications can directly use the Caching API to programmatically cache and retrieve any serializable managed objects.

AppFabric 1.1 Versions

History
In June 2008,  Microsoft released the beta version of Windows Server AppFabric with a code name 'Velocity'.

In June 2010, Microsoft released Windows Server AppFabric 1.0. The next release, 1.1, was rebranded to Microsoft AppFabric 1.1 for Windows Server.

In April 2015, Microsoft announced that it would end support for AppFabric for Windows Server on 2 April 2016. In June 2015, Microsoft announced that it would end support for AppFabric 1.1 for Windows Server on 11 April 2017, with Extended Support being available until 12 April 2022.

See also
Microsoft Azure

References

External links
 Download: Microsoft AppFabric 1.1 for Windows Server
 Microsoft AppFabric 1.1 for Windows Server Documentation
 AppFabric Class Library Reference
 AppFabric Developer Center
 AppFabric Now Supported on Windows Server 2012

Microsoft software
Windows Server